Shanmugam "Sam" Murugesu (c.1967 – 13 May 2005) was the 1995 Singaporean National Jet Ski Champion. In 2005, he was executed for bringing cannabis into Singapore from Malaysia.

Biography
As a young man, he served in the Singaporean Army for 8 years, when a tank accident cost him his position there. He then turned to a passion for water sports, and was the Singaporean National Jet Ski champion. He went on to represent Singapore at the 1995 IJSBA World Finals in Lake Havasu City, USA. His leg was broken when his jet ski was rammed by another competitor, and his desire to support his extended family took precedence over racing. He also suffered a severe hand injury while working as a mechanic. His love of the ocean led him to teach sailing and work for the Singapore Sports Council for four years. He also worked as a taxi driver and window cleaner.

In 2003, Shanmugam was arrested while crossing the Singapore/Malaysia border with 1.03 kg (2.2 lbs) of cannabis. 

Shanmugam was represented by M Ravi during his trial. He was sentenced to death on 29 April 2004.

A clemency plea to the president of Singapore, Tony Tan, was rejected.

A last minute application to delay Shanmugam's execution was rejected by the High Court. On 12 May 2005, Shanmugam was hanged on 13 May 2005.

His death inspired artistic director Benny Lim to put on a one-man experimental play, Humans Lefts, to discuss the social issue of the death penalty.

Personal life 
Shanmugam was divorced and had two twin sons.

References

External links 

 https://www.ijsba.com The International Jet Sports Boating Association .

2005 deaths
Singaporean sportsmen
Jet skiers
Singaporean taxi drivers
21st-century executions by Singapore
People executed by hanging
Executed Singaporean people
People executed for drug offences
Singaporean drug traffickers